Utetheisa pectinata is a moth of the family Erebidae first described by George Hampson in 1907. It is found on the islands of Arafura Sea (Moa, Dammer, Tiandoe and Tam, Tenimber, Little Key) and in Australia (where it is only known from the coastal strip of the Northern Territory).

Taxonomy
The subspecies Utetheisa pectinata ruberrima is now considered a synonym of Utetheisa salomonis.

References

pectinata
Moths described in 1907